Zone is a comune in the province of Brescia, in Lombardy, northern Italy. It is situated in a mountain valley east of Lake Iseo. The town is known for the nearby "Pyramids of Zone", formations of large rock pillars created by erosion. Its coat of arms shows three of these pillars.

References

Cities and towns in Lombardy